Paul LeDuc (born 1939) is a former Canadian professional wrestler. He is best known for teaming with his kayfabe (storyline) brother Jos LeDuc.

Career
LeDuc began wrestling professionally in 1957 at age 18. He began his training in Montreal, Quebec and later moved to Mexico for further instruction. He talked a friend, Michel Pigeon, into becoming a wrestler as well. Pigeon agreed and took on the ring name Jos LeDuc, as the pair pretended to be brothers. They first worked together in Stu Hart's Stampede Wrestling promotion in Calgary, Alberta. The LeDucs used a lumberjack gimmick to honor deceased professional wrestler "Yukon" Eric Holmback. While wrestling in Stampede Wrestling, the pair held the Stampede International Tag Team Championship.

The LeDucs next moved back to Montreal. They feuded with the Rougeau family as well as the Vachon brothers (Maurice and Paul). During a wrestling show in Montreal, Paul LeDuc was legitimately married in the wrestling ring. They also held the Grand Prix Wrestling Tag Team Championship twice in 1972 and 1973.

The LeDucs also wrestled in Florida, where they were known as the Canadian Lumberjacks. In December 1973, they defeated Dusty Rhodes and Dick Slater to win the NWA Florida Tag Team Championship.

Retirement
LeDuc retired from wrestling in 1978 and began working for Quebecor, a communications company, the following year. He later accepted a position writing about professional wrestling for Canadian Online Explorer.

LeDuc's long-time friend and tag team partner died in 1999. The pair had played the role of brothers so well that, when it was revealed that they were not related, the news was widely discussed on talk shows in Quebec. Paul LeDuc's son, Carl, is also a professional wrestler.

Championships and accomplishments
Championship Wrestling from Florida
NWA Florida Tag Team Championship (1 time) - with Jos LeDuc
Grand Prix Wrestling (Montreal)
Grand Prix Tag Team Championship (2 times) - with Jos LeDuc
Stampede Wrestling
NWA International Tag Team Championship (Calgary version) (1 time) - with Jos LeDuc

References

External links
Paul LeDuc biography at SLAM! Wrestling Canadian Hall of Fame

1939 births
Canadian male professional wrestlers
Living people
Stampede Wrestling alumni
20th-century professional wrestlers
WWC Puerto Rico Champions
Professional wrestlers from Montreal
Stampede Wrestling International Tag Team Champions